Sutton Grange is a small settlement in North Yorkshire, England,  north west of Ripon.  It was historically a township in the parish of Ripon in the West Riding of Yorkshire, and became a separate civil parish in 1866.  By 1961 the population of the parish was only 40.  In 1974 it was transferred to Harrogate district in North Yorkshire, and in 1988 it was absorbed into the civil parish of North Stainley with Sleningford.

Sutton Grange was the site of a grange of Fountains Abbey.  Earthworks surrounding an enclosure known as Hall Garth represent the only visible remains of the grange.

References 

Villages in North Yorkshire
Former civil parishes in North Yorkshire